Plantman is the name of two fictional characters appearing in American comic books published by Marvel Comics.

Publication history

The Samuel Smithers version of Plantman first appeared in Strange Tales #113 and was created by Stan Lee, Jerry Siegel (under the alias of Joe Carter), and Dick Ayers.

The Paul version of Plantman first appeared in The Astonishing Ant-Man #7 and was created by Nick Spencer and Ramon Rosanas.

Fictional character biography

Samuel Smithers

Growing up as a poor London orphan, Samuel Smithers found refuge and work as a lab assistant with a famous botanist who was researching the intelligence of plant life. After the botanist's death, Smithers traveled to the United States, hoping to continue his mentor's work. He invents a device capable of communicating with plants. Laughed out of the scientific community when he attempts to show his findings, he only finds work as a gardener. However, a freak lightning storm strikes Smithers' plant ray-gun, allowing it to control and animate plant life. With his "Vege-ray" and a disguise as Plantman, Smithers seeks revenge on his former employers, but he is stopped by the Human Torch. Plantman attempts revenge on the Human Torch which ends with Plantman's arrest. He breaks out of jail, however, and travels to the southwestern United States to grow more plants, this time with his own spliced cells. Here he had partial control, but was also sensitive to the plant's whims. When at one point he thought he had killed Tony Stark, he decided to go directly for world domination, but was foiled by Iron Man.

Count Nefaria breaks the Plantman and several others out of prison to serve as his lieutenants to help bolster his prominence in the Maggia crime family. To this end, Plantman, the original Eel, the original Porcupine, the original Unicorn and the Scarecrow capture the mutant team the X-Men in an extortion attempt, but the mutants defeat their captors. Plantman manages to pilfer technology from the Maggia before his escape, using it to create a monstrous Leviathan out of animated seaweed to terrorize London. It is stopped by Namor and Triton of the Inhumans, but Plantman escapes.

Plantman has often used plant "simuloids" to create duplicates of himself for mercenary endeavors, raising quick cash to continue his research. One of the first known activities of his simuloids was to join his former allies and the original Viper in a crime wave under the command of the Cowled Commander (only to be stopped by Captain America and the Falcon). Another time, a simuloid kidnapped wealthy businessman Kyle Richmond (Nighthawk) for ransom, but Nighthawk's allies in the Defenders helped rescue him, and Nebulon subdued the simuloid. Spider-Man and the Falcon discovered an exotic plant-breeding nursery where they encountered and defeated the caretaking Plantman-simuloid. Another Plantman-simuloid's scheme to rob a bank was thwarted by two of the Micronauts.

Next with an army of 1,000 plant simulacra, the true Plantman captured the President of the United States by taking over an American military base. He attempted to take over S.H.I.E.L.D. using simuloids. Hawkeye and the Orb stumbled upon Plantman's mobile plant-growing factory and he expelled them.

During the Acts of Vengeance storyline, Plantman joined with a group of villains to attack the Fantastic Four. Soon after, he tries a solo attack on the Avengers who are visiting a construction site. He is defeated by the site's employees who fear the battle might destroy their hard work.

During Smithers' subsequent prison sentence in Seagate Federal Penitentiary, he was contacted telepathically by Mentallo, who was being held in a stasis field in the same prison. Mentallo was still capable of using his powers and he used them to orchestrate a break-out of his fellow prisoners, which included the hero Hawkeye (who was serving time for crimes he performed while a member of the Thunderbolts) and Headlok (whom Mentallo had possessed). The criminals, remotely "chained" to one another, escaped as the so-called Chain Gang. The Chain Gang reluctantly agreed to work together to search for a way to survive, deactivate their security manacles, and search for a weapon of great power left behind by the death of the criminal industrialist Justin Hammer. The weapon had come to the attention of Mentallo by Hammer himself before he died, as Hammer awakened Mentallo's powers while he was in the stasis field. Unknown to his associates, Hawkeye was actually working undercover on behalf of S.H.I.E.L.D. Ultimately, the Chain Gang was tracked down by Hawkeye's former teammate Songbird, who helped Hawkeye defeat the villains. They discovered that Hammer's legacy was a biological toxin that had been ingested by every single villain who had ever worked for him. Smithers was the carrier. Hawkeye, Songbird, and Smithers began a new search for the trigger that would release Plantman's toxin so that it would not fall into the wrong hands.

The search ended with Hammer's daughter, Justine, who turned out to be the Crimson Cowl, leader of the Masters of Evil. Hawkeye convinced several members of the Masters of Evil to side with him and Songbird against Crimson Cowl and their former allies, pointing out the dangers of the super-weapon, which would either blackmail or kill them. Hoping to throw off suspicion, Hawkeye made the villains reinvent their costumed identities, thus creating a new team of Thunderbolts, and Smithers joined the group as Blackheath.

Beginning with his time in prison, Smithers had noticed that his body was in the process of mutating, drawing him closer to the energy field that he manipulated to control plants. When the Thunderbolts finally confronted the Crimson Cowl, Smithers was captured and experimented upon to reveal the secrets of the bio-toxin. During this procedure, Smithers' spirit connected with the energy field, the so-called Verdant Green, the embodiment of the Earth's biosphere. The Verdant Green pointed out that Smithers could release the toxin, removing humanity from the biosphere and allowing the plants to flourish as in its pre-industrial days. Instead, Smithers chose to release an antidote for the toxin into the atmosphere and appeared to die in the attempt.

The Thunderbolts ultimately defeated the Cowl and her Masters of Evil, but they were confronted by the Elite Agents of S.H.I.E.L.D. who caught up with them and wanted the remains of Blackheath's body. Finally, Smithers was able to revive himself by sucking the moisture from the villain Hydro-Man, leaving Hydro-Man's body desiccated. The Thunderbolts were aided against S.H.I.E.L.D. by the arrival of the true Citizen V, who needed the team's immediate help with his agency's ship — the engines of which were made of alien technology that had begun distorting, threatening to suck the Earth into the null space of a white hole. In so doing, the Thunderbolts encountered the original Thunderbolts, who emerged from the void after severing the alien ship's presence from where they had been trapped on Counter-Earth. The two teams of Thunderbolts combined forces to plug the void and shunt the alien ship from Earth, similar to the manner in which Baron Helmut Zemo's team stopped the threat on Counter-Earth.

After much discussion, most of the costumed heroes and villains chose to part ways. Smithers elected to join the Thunderbolts, hoping that their new mission, to rule the world in order to save it, would closely match his own goals of protecting the Verdant Green from humans. He increasingly began to lose touch with his humanity, increasingly motivated by his connection to the Green.

Blackheath joined the Thunderbolts in many acts of questionable heroism under Zemo's leadership, where the ends justified the means. Zemo's ultimate plan involved the creation of "the Liberator," a device that would drain abnormal uses of energy throughout the world and hopefully reduce global threats, eliminate superhuman terrorism, and stabilize the world's status quo. The Thunderbolts succeeded in launching the Liberator, only to be confronted by the Avengers. Feeling betrayed, Moonstone absorbed the powers the Liberator had harnessed, combining them with her already-increased powers of the moonstone. The Thunderbolts and the Avengers teamed up to defeat Moonstone, ultimately removing the alien gems that gave her her powers.

The members of the Thunderbolts agree to go their separate ways, and Smithers agrees to return to prison, hoping to reconnect with his human nature that he felt he was slowly losing.

During the "AXIS" storyline, Plantman appears as a giant plant monster and attacks Los Angeles to retaliate at humans for polluting the world. When a group of Avengers attack, they turn on each other due to the influence of Red Onslaught, a clone of Red Skull with parts of Professor X's brain placed in him. Plantman is defeated by Iron Man.

During the "Avengers: Standoff!" storyline, Plantman is an inmate of Pleasant Hill, a gated community established by S.H.I.E.L.D.

During the "Empyre" storyline, Plantman had laid sieged to Central Park during the Cotati invasion and fought Vision until the fight is taken out of Central Park. When Luke Cage thinks it's a Cotati, Vision states that he is actually Plantman who claims that his goals are similar to the Cotati's goals. Vision tries to reason with Plantman only for him to create Sprout Soldiers out of his plants. Doctor Nemesis, Luke Cage, and Vision continue their fight with Plantman and his Sprout Soldiers. They managed to defeat Plantman, but are unable to make contact with Black Panther.

Paul
A man named Paul used to work as a clerk at a comic book store until his boss fired him stealing comic books with variant covers which he planned to sell to support his gaming hobby. He later attended Power Broker Inc.'s presentation of the Hench X App where Power Broker tests it on Paul. The Hench X App transforms Paul into a new Plantman just as Ant-Man arrives. To further demonstrate the Hench X App, Power Broker has Plantman fight Ant-Man. Due to Plantman's inexperience, Ant-Man managed to have his ants eat Plantman's weaponry before defeating him.

During the "Avengers: Standoff!"' storyline, Plantman was an inmate of Pleasant Hill, a gated community established by S.H.I.E.L.D. Using the powers of Kobik, S.H.I.E.L.D. turned him into an unnamed TV repairman.

Plantman later appears as a member of Baron Helmut Zemo's "New Masters" alongside Firebrand and Flying Tiger. They later encounter Steve Rogers, the original Captain America, Free Spirit and Jack Flag. During the fight, Plantman surrenders peacefully while Free Spirit defeats Firebrand.

Powers and abilities
Originally, the Samuel Smithers version of Plantman used various devices to control plants. He used a chloro-blaster gun which promoted rampant plant growth, a vega-ray gun able to animate any plant, and spore-shooting pistols. He also used large scale cannons able to do what the hand-held chloro-blaster and vega-ray gun would do on a larger scale. Plantman also has the ability to control the movements of his animated plant creatures, called simuloids. Simuloids are humanoid plant life constructs grown from alien spores; they are made of wood and capable of movement and mimicking human life, and are capable of speech and can be programmed as extensively as any hi-tech robot. There are two basic kinds of Simuloids: "Heavies" and "Replicas". Certain Plantman simuloids were programmed with Samuel Smithers' brain patterns to believe they were the original Plantman, thus it is not always clear whether any appearance of Plantman is the actual Plantman. In one instance, a simuloid gained independence to the point that it became a separate, sentient entity, re-christening itself Terraformer and becoming part of the ecological/elemental-themed supervillain team, the Force of Nature. Plantman has extensive knowledge of gardening and an aptitude towards gadgetry.

The Paul version of Plantman can control plants and is also made of plants.

Other versions

Marvel Adventures
Samuel Smithers was a scientist who valued plants over people. Smithers donned a plant armor, and became the supervillain Plantman, battling Iron Man, only to meet defeat. Plantman was also hired to attack Tony Stark, but defeated by a remote controlled Iron Man armor.

In other media
The Samuel Smithers version of Plantman appears in The Super Hero Squad Show episode "O Captain, My Captain" voiced by Charlie Adler. He uses an Infinity Fractal to control the plants in the Amazon rainforest causing Captain America's International All-Captains Squad (consisting of Captain America, Captain Australia, Captain Brazil, Captain Britain, Captain Liechtenstein, and Wolverine as Captain Canada) to fight him and his plant army. He was defeated when Wolverine used the reflective glass to direct the sun beams toward the plant army.

References

External links
 Plantman at Marvel.com
 Plantman (Samuel Smithers) at Marvel Database
 Plantman (Paul) at Marvel Database
 
 Plantman at Writeups.org

Characters created by Dick Ayers
Characters created by Jerry Siegel
Characters created by Stan Lee
Comics characters introduced in 1963
Fictional botanists
Fictional characters with plant abilities
Marvel Comics male supervillains
Marvel Comics mutates
Marvel Comics orphans
Marvel Comics plant characters